The Catherine Ferry was a ferry route connecting Manhattan and Brooklyn in the United States, joining Catherine Street in Manhattan and Main Street in Brooklyn across the East River.

The ferry, originally known as the New Ferry, was established on August 1, 1795 to supplement the Fulton Ferry (Old Ferry). It eventually passed into the hands of Samuel Bowne, who sold it to Smith & Bulkley on March 24, 1852. Being unable to compete with the one-cent fare adopted by the Brooklyn Union Ferry Company in November 1850, it was sold to the new Union Ferry Company of Brooklyn (the successor to the Brooklyn Union) in December 1853.

References 

East River
Ferries of New York City